Laski Bruskie is a village in the administrative district of Gmina Stary Brus, within Włodawa County, Lublin Voivodeship, in eastern Poland.

The village has an approximate population of 37.

References

Laski Bruskie